is a professional wrestling stable, currently performing in the Japanese professional wrestling promotion World Wonder Ring Stardom. The stable currently consists of Tam Nakano, Unagi Sayaka, Mina Shirakawa, Waka Tsukiyama, Saki, Hikari Shimizu, Yuko Sakurai, Rina Amikura and Natsupoi. They are often known by their catchphrase {{Nihongo|We are and you are, delicious!|私たちは、あなたはデリシャスです|Watashitachiha, anata wa derishasu}}.

History

 Formation 
The stable initially debuted as a sub-group of the Stars stable led by Mayu Iwatani on November 14, 2020, after Tam Nakano brought Mina Shirakawa from Tokyo Joshi Pro Wrestling, teaming up with her to defeat Iwatani and Starlight Kid, subsequently convincing Iwatani to accept Shirakawa in the stable. Shortly after Shirakawa joining the Stardom, Nakano recruited Unagi Sayaka into the sub-group who also came from TJPW. At Stardom Sendai Cinderella 2020 on November 15, Nakano, Sayaka and Shirakawa defeated Natsuko Tora, Rina and Saki Kashima.

2020
Split from Stars; under Nakano's leadership

Tam Nakano, Mina Shirakawa and Unagi Sayaka teamed up on December 16, 2020, at Road to Osaka Dream Cinderella to defeat Oedo Tai's Bea Priestley, Natsuko Tora and Saki Kashima for the Artist of Stardom Championship. Four days later, Nakano explained that the three of them peacefully parted ways with Stars and started acting as an independent unit ever since.

2021
At Stardom All Star Dream Cinderella on March 3, 2021, Unagi Sayaka won a 24-women Stardom All Star Rumble featuring superstars from the company's past such as Yuzuki Aikawa, Chigusa Nagayo, Kyoko Inoue, Hiroyo Matsumoto and Emi Sakura, and from the present like Lady C and Starlight Kid. On the same night, Tam Nakano defeated Giulia in a Hair vs. Hair match to win the Wonder of Stardom Championship. One month later at Stardom Yokohama Dream Cinderella 2021 from April 4, Mina Shirakawa fell short to Momo Watanabe in a singles match, Unagi Sayaka to Saya Kamitani and Nakano successfully defended the Wonder of Stardom Championship against Natsupoi. Unagi Sayaka participated in the Stardom Cinderella Tournament 2021, defeating Natsuko Tora in the first round matches but falling short to Maika in the semi-finals. Mina took part in a tournament to crown a new Future of Stardom Champion and defeated Ruaka in a first round match on June 8. At Yokohama Dream Cinderella 2021 in Summer on July 4, Mina Shirakawa defeated Unagi Sayaka in the tournament final to win the vacant Future of Stardom Championship while Nakano defended the Wonder of Stardom Championship successfully against the 2021 Cinderella Tournament winner Saya Kamitani. The Stardom 5 Star Grand Prix 2021 saw Shirakawa Nakano and Sayaka participating in the competition, with the latter two fighting in the "Blue Stars Block" and Shirakawa in the "Red Light Block". Nakano scored a total of ten points, Sayaka a tota of nine, while Shirakawa only six. On the sixth night of the tournament which took place in the Korakuen Hall on August 13, after losing the Future of Stardom Championship match to Unagi Sayaka, Mai Sakurai was presented as the newest member of Cosmic Angels and was announced to undergo a newcomer "challenge" against ten opponents during the tournament. On the ninth night from September 4 it was revealed that Waka Tsukiyama from Actwres girl'Z would make her debut in Stardom. Just as Mai Sakurai, she was announced to undergo a rookie "challenge" against ten different opponents. On September 28, Stardom held the press conference for the Stardom 10th Anniversary Grand Final Osaka Dream Cinderella  event which they broadcast live on their YouTube channel. While holding her speech for her match pairing with Lady C against Oedo Tai's Saki Kashima and Rina, Waka Tsukiyama called out Tam Nakano and requested her and the other Cosmic Angels members to join their unit which they accepted. Mina Shirakawa and Mai Sakurai are also scheduled to face Marvelous' Rin Kadokura and Maria, Sayaka to defend her Future of Stardom Championship against Ruaka and Nakano her Wonder of Stardom Championship against Mayu Iwatani. Nakano, Shirakawa and Sayaka dropped the Artist of Stardom Championship to Maika, Natsupoi and Himeka at Stardom in Nagoya from October 3, 2021, after keeping the titles for 291 consecutive days making them the longest reigning champions till date. At Stardom 10th Anniversary Grand Final Osaka Dream Cinderella on October 9, 2021, Ruaka defeated Unagi Sayaka to win the Future of Stardom Championship, Mina Shirakawa and Mai Sakurai fell short to Marvelous (Rin Kadokura and Maria), Waka Tsukiyama teamed up with Lady C in a losing effort to Oedo Tai (Saki Kashima and Rina) and Tam Nakano wrestled Mayu Iwatani in a time-limit draw while successfully defending the Wonder of Stardom Championship. At Kawasaki Super Wars, the first event of the Stardom Super Wars trilogy which took place on November 3, Mai Sakurai defeated Waka Tsukiyama to stay in Cosmic Angels, Shirakawa defeated Maika and Saya Kamitani in a three-way match and Sayaka unsuccessfully challenged Nakano for the Wonder of Stardom Championship. At Tokyo Super Wars on November 27, Mai Sakurai and Waka Tsukiyama unsuccessfully challenged Ruaka for the Future of Stardom Championship in a three-way match, Unagi Sayaka teamed up with Lady C to fall short to MOMOAZ (AZM and Momo Watanabe) and Tam Nakano successfully defended her Wonder of Stardom Championship against Mina Shirakawa, making peace with her and ending any other grudge between the stable members. At Osaka Super Wars, the last event from the trilogy from December 18, Mai Sakurai, Waka Tsukiyama and Lady C unsuccessfully fought Syuri in a 3-on-1 handicap gauntlet match and Tam Nakano, Mina Shirakawa and Unagi Sayaka fell short to Stars (Mayu Iwatani, Hazuki and Koguma) in a Six-woman tag team match ¥10 Million Unit Tournament semi-final. At Stardom Dream Queendom on December 29, Waka Tsukiyama competed in a five-way match won by Fukige Death and also involving Rina, Saki Kashima and Lady C, Mina Shirakawa, Unagi Sayaka and Mai Sakurai unsuccessfully challenged MaiHimePoi (Maika, Natsupoi and Himeka) for the Artist of Stardom Championship, and Tam Nakano dropped the Wonder of Stardom Championship to Saya Kamitani having her reign ended at 301 days.

2022

At Stardom Nagoya Supreme Fight on January 29, 2022, Mai Sakurai, Waka Tsukiyama and Tam Nakano were not eligible to compete due to bad health condition, Mina Shirakawa unsuccessfully battled Thekla for the vacant SWA World Championship and Unagi Sayaka unsuccessfully challenged Saya Kamitani for the Wonder of Stardom Championship. At Stardom in Osaka on February 12, 2021, Tam Nakano, Unagi Sayaka and Mai Sakurai fell short to Giulia, Thekla and Mirai in a six-woman tag team match. After months of Giulia asking Sakurai if she wants to be stronger, Sakurai told Nakano “I don’t want to dance, I want to wrestle” and joined Donna Del Mondo. At Stardom Cinderella Journey on February 23, 2022, Waka Tsukiyama unsuccessfully faced Rina and Mai Sakurai in a three-way number one's contendership match for the Future of Stardom Championship, Mina Shirakawa and Unagi Sayaka unsuccessfully faced FWC (Hazuki and Koguma) for the Goddess of Stardom Championship ans Tam Nakano teamed up with Mayu Iwatani to defeat Oedo Tai's Fukigen Death and Saki Kashima. At Stardom New Blood 1 on March 11, 2022, Unagi Sayaka and Waka Tsukiyama fell short to Marvelous' Maria and Ai Houzan. On the first night of the Stardom World Climax 2022 from March 26, Waka Tsukiyama and Mina Shirakawa teamed with Momo Kohgo to unsuccessfully compete in a six-woman tag team gauntlet match, and Tam Nakano alongside Unagi Sayaka unsuccessfully faced Mayu Iwatani and a returning Kairi. On the second night from March 27, Unagi Sayaka, Mina Shirakawa and Waka Tsukiyama participated in a 18-women Cinderella Rumble match won by Mei Suruga and also involving other opponents from both Stardom and the independent scene such as Tomoka Inaba, Haruka Umesaki, Nanami, Maria, Ai Houzan, and Yuna Mizumori. In the main event, Tam Nakano failed to recapture the Wonder of Stardom Championship from Saya Kamitani. At Stardom Cinderella Tournament 2022, all members participated with Unagi Sayaka scoring the best result as she made it to the second rounds on April 10. At Stardom Golden Week Fight Tour on May 5, 2022, Tam Nakano, Mina Shirakawa and Unagi Sayaka defeated Queen's Quest (Utami Hayashishita, AZM and Lady C) in a six-woman tag team match. At Stardom Flashing Champions on May 28, 2022, Mina Shirakawa, Unagi Sayaka and Waka Tsukiyama fell short to Prominence (Suzu Suzuki, Akane Fujita and Mochi Natsumi) and Tam Nakano teamed up with Kairi to defeat Utami Hayashishita and Miyu Amasaki.

Association with Color's (June)
At Stardom in Korakuen Hall on June 5, 2022, Unagi Sayaka, Tam Nakano and Mina Shirakawa defeated Color's (Saki, Hikari Shimizu and Yuko Sakurai) in a loser joins enemy unit. The three announced that they will compete as a sub-unit in the future, and Rina Amikura was also reported to have joined Angels due to being part of Color's at that time.

At Stardom Fight in the Top on June 26, 2022, Unagi Sayaka and Waka Tsukiyama fell short to Ruaka in a three-way match, Mina Shirakawa unsuccessfully challenged Himeka, and Tam Nakano picked a victory over Natsupoi in one of the first ever steel cage matches ever promoted by Stardom. At Stardom New Blood 3 on July 8, 2022, Waka Tsukiyama fell short to Ram Kaicho and Unagi Sayaka, Mina Shirakawa, Yuko Sakurai and Rina Amikura fell short to Starlight Kid, Ruaka, Rina and Haruka Umesaki. At Mid Summer Champions in Tokyo, the first event of the Stardom Mid Summer Champions which took place on July 9, 2022, Tam Nakano, Unagi Sayaka, Mina Shirakawa, Saki and Hikari Shimizu challenged Giulia, Maika, Himeka, Natsupoi and Mai Sakurai in an elimination tag team match. Natsupoi betrayed Donna Del Mondo by attacking Giulia mid-match, attracting Donna Del Mondo's loss. Natsupoi subsequently joined Cosmic Angels in the process. At Stardom in Showcase vol.1 on July 23, 2022, Unagi Sayaka, Mina Shirakawa and Saki brawled into a no contest as a result of a comedic "Cosmic rules" match, and Tam Nakano took part into a four-way falls count anywhere match won by AZM and also involving Koguma and Momo Watanabe. At Mid Summer Champions in Tokyo, the first event of the Stardom Mid Summer Champions which took place on July 9, 2022, Yuko Sakurai fought in a three-way match won by Lady C and also involving Hina, Waka Tsukiyama unsuccessfully challenged Hanan for the Future of Stardom Championship, and Tam Nakano, Unagi Sayaka, Mina Shirakawa, Saki and Hikari Shimizu teamed up to defeat Donna Del Mondo's Giulia, Maika, Himeka, Natsupoi and Mai Sakurai in an elimination match. At Mid Summer Champions in Nagoya on July 24, Rina Amikura teamed up with Mai Sakurai to fall short to Hanan and Saya Iida, Mina Shirakawa, Unagi Sayaka & Hikari Shimizu unsuccessfully competed in a three-way tag team match won by Prominence (Risa Sera, Hiragi Kurumi and Suzu Suzuki), and also involving Lady C, Hina and Miyu Amasaki, Saki unsuccessfully challenged Saya Kamitani for the Wonder of Stardom Championship, and Tam Nakano unsuccessfully challenged Syuri for the World of Stardom Championship. At Stardom x Stardom: Nagoya Midsummer Encounter on August 21, 2022, Mina Shirakawa, Unagi Sayaka and Saki unsuccessfully challenged Saki Kashima, Momo Watanabe and Starlight Kid for the Artist of Stardom Championship, but Tam Nakano and Natsupoi succeeded in defeating Hazuki and Koguma to capture the Goddess of Stardom Championship. At Stardom New Blood 4 on August 26, 2022, Waka Tsukiyama teamed up with Momoka Hanazono in a losing effort against Ram Kaicho and Rina, and Tam Nakano defeated Miyu Amasaki in the main event. At Stardom in Showcase vol.2 on September 25, 2022, the teams of Tam Nakano & Natsupoi and Saki & Hikari Shimizu defeated the team of Mina Shirakawa and Unagi Sayaka by disqualification as a result of a Cosmic Rule Three-Way Match. On October 3, 2022, Unagi Sayaka announced she was leaving Stardom to become a free agent. She also stated that she would not be leaving Cosmic Angels. At Stardom New Blood 5 on October 19, 2022, Mina Shirakawa and Waka Tsukiyama teamed up with Yuna Mizumori in a losing effort against Rina, Ram Kaicho and Linda. At Hiroshima Goddess Festival on November 3, 2022, Waka Tsukiyama unsuccessfully competed in a five-way match against AZM, Lady C, Miyu Amasaki and Saya Iida, Tam Nakano and Natsupoi successfully defended the Goddess of Stardom Championship against Momo Watanabe and Starlight Kid, and Mina Shirakawa unsuccessfully challenged Saya Kamitani for the Wonder of Stardom Championship. At Stardom Gold Rush on November 19, 2022, Tam Nakano, Natsupoi and Waka Tsukiyama unsuccessfully challenged Giulia, Thekla and Mai Sakurai in the first rounds of a "Moneyball tournament". At Stardom in Showcase vol.3 on November 26, 2022, Tam Nakano, Natsupoi and a brief returning Unagi Sayaka fell short to Prominence's Suzu Suzuki, Risa Sera and Hiragi Kurumi in a hardcore tag team match.

Club Venus birth (December)
At Stardom Dream Queendom 2 on December 29, 2022, Saki and Waka Tsukiyama competed in a Stardom rambo, Hikari Shimizu unsuccessfully challenged AZM for the High Speed Championship, Unagi Sayaka and Mina Shirakawa returned each and defeated Thekla and Mai Sakurai. After the match, Shirakawa slapped Unagi and together with Xia Brookside and Mariah May she formed a new sub-unit named "Club Venus, later Mina confirmed that she remained Cosmic Angels member, only that she ended her "Pink Kabuki" tag team tenure with Sayaka.  Tam Nakano and Natsupoi dropped the Goddess of Stardom Championship to 7Upp (Nanae Takahashi and Yuu).

2023
At Stardom New Blood 7 on January 20, 2023, Waka Tsukiyama fell short to Nanae Takahashi. At Stardom Supreme Fight 2023 on February 4, 2023, Tam Nakano, Waka Tsukiyama and Natsupoi competed in a call your shot match for a title of choice.

New Japan Pro Wrestling (2021)
Nakano was part of the series of Stardom exhibition matches to promote female talent hosted by New Japan Pro Wrestling. On the second night of Wrestle Kingdom 15 from January 5, 2021, she teamed up with former stablemate Mayu Iwatani in a losing effort against Donna Del Mondo's Syuri and Giulia. On the second night of Wrestle Kingdom 16 on January 5, 2022, she teamed up with Saya Kamitani to defeat Starlight Kid and Mayu Iwatani. At Rumble on 44th Street on October 28, 2022, Mina Shirakawa and Waka Tsukiyama unsuccessfully challenged Kylie Rae and Tiara James. At Historic X-Over on November 20, 2022, Waka Tsukiyama competed in the Stardom Rambo, and Tam Nakano and Natsupoi teamed up with Taichi and Yoshinobu Kanemaru to defeat Suzuki-gun's El Desperado and Douki, and Oedo Tai's Starlight Kid and Momo Watanabe in a mixed tag team match.

Freelance work (2022–present)
After Saki, Rina Amikura, Hikari Shimizu and Yuko Sakurai joined Cosmic Angels as the sub-unit of Color's, they continued to do freelance work since they were not full-time members of Stardom's roster. Saki and Shimizu participated in the 2022 edition of the Catch the Wave tournament. Saki reached the final A Block where she scored two points after competing against Nagisa Nozaki, Risa Sera and Kaori Yoneyama. Shimizu fought in the Block B where she also scored two points after going against Suzu Suzuki, Haruka Umesaki and Itsuki Aoki. On August 11, 2022, at Pure-J Rainbow Mountain 2022, Saki teamed up with Raydeen Hagane to defeat Kaori Yoneyama and Kakeru Sekiguchi for the Daily Sports Women's Tag Team Championship. At WAVE 15th Anniversary ~ Carnival WAVE on August 13, 2022, Saki and Hikari Shimizu defeated Yuki Miyazaki and Hibiscus Mii to win the Wave Tag Team Championship.

Members

Current

Former

Sub-groups
Current

Former

Timeline

Championships and accomplishments
Actwres girl'Z
AWG Color's Championship (2 times, current) – Saki and Amikura
 Pro Wrestling Illustrated Ranked Nakano No. 9 of the top 150 female singles wrestlers in the PWI Women's 150 in 2021
 Ranked Natsupoi No. 55 of the top 150 female singles wrestlers in the PWI Women's 150 in 2022
 Ranked Shirakawa No. 123 of the top 150 female singles wrestlers in the PWI Women's 150 in 2022
 Ranked Sayaka No. 147 of the top 150 female singles wrestlers in the PWI Women's 150 in 2021
Pro Wrestling Wave
Wave Tag Team Championship (1 time) – Saki and Shimizu
Pure-J
Daily Sports Women's Tag Team Championship (1 time, current) – Saki with Rydeen Hagane''
World Wonder Ring Stardom
Wonder of Stardom Championship (1 time) – Nakano
Goddess of Stardom Championship (1 time) – Nakano and Natsupoi
Artist of Stardom Championship (1 time) – Nakano, Shirakawa and Sayaka
Future of Stardom Championship (2 times) – Shirakawa (1) and Sayaka (1)
 5★Star GP Award (2 times)
 5★Star GP Finalist Award (2022) 
 5★Star GP Fighting Spirit Award (2021) – 
 Stardom Year-End Award (5 times)
 Fighting Spirit Award – 
 Match of the Year – 
 Best Tag Team Award – 
 Shining Award –

Luchas de Apuestas record

See also
Donna Del Mondo
Neo Stardom Army
Queen's Quest
God's Eye
Oedo Tai
Stars

Notes

References

External links 

 

Independent promotions teams and stables
Japanese promotions teams and stables
Women's wrestling teams and stables
World Wonder Ring Stardom teams and stables